Kharman Sukhteh (also Romanized as Kharman Sūkhteh) is a village in Arzuiyeh Rural District, in the Central District of Arzuiyeh County, Kerman Province, Iran. At the 2006 census, its population was 172, in 45 families.

References 

Populated places in Arzuiyeh County